Barkha may refer to:
 Barkha Dutt, an Indian journalist
 Barkha Madan, an Indian actress and former model
Barkha Sengupta, an Indian actress
 Barkha Sharma, an Indian fashion designer
 Barkha Singh, an Indian actress
 Barkha (1960 film), an Indian film
 Barkha Bahar, a 1973 Indian film
 Barkhaa, a 2015 Indian film